The city of Rome, founded in a strategic location among a war-like people (the Etruscans), needed to concern itself with military activity from the start. As Rome grew, its military needs changed. This article covers the military establishment of the Roman kingdom up to about 300 BC.

Initial army

Rome was probably founded as a compromise between Etruscan residents of the area and Italic tribes nearby. The kings were Etruscan. Their language was still spoken by noble families in the early empire, although sources tell us it was dying out. Under the first king, Romulus, society consisted of gentes, or clans, arranged in 80 curiae and three tribes. From them were selected 8000 pedites (infantry) and 800 celeres (cavalry) of gentes-connected men. The decimal scheme seems already to have existed: one unit of fast troops for every 10 of foot.

 	
The Etruscans were heavily influenced by Greek culture, which can be viewed as dominating the eastern Mediterranean. At first, under the Etruscan Kings, the massive Greek phalanx was the most desired battle formation. Early Roman soldiers hence must have looked much like Greek hoplites. However, for the military in ancient Rome, the armor and weapons they had at their disposal was dictated by social class.

Reforms of Servius Tullius
A key moment in Roman history was the introduction of the census (the counting of the people) under Servius Tullius. He had found that the aristocratic organization now did not provide enough men for defense against the hill tribes, and, consequently, he accepted non-aristocrats into the state and reorganized society on the basis of wealth, determined at the census.

Citizens were graded into six classes by property assessment. From them were recruited militias according to the equipment they could afford and the needs of the state.

From the wealthiest classes were recruited the heavily armed infantry, equipped like the Greek hoplite warrior with helmet, round shield (clipeus), greaves and breastplate, all of bronze, and carrying a spear (hasta) and sword (not the gladius). In battle, they followed the principle of "two forward, one back." The first and second acies, or lines of battle, composed of principes and hastati, were forward; the triarii or "third rank", containing the veterani, or "old ones", was held in reserve. From the name, hastati,  one can deduce that the hasta, a thrusting spear, was the weapon of choice. Triarii were equipped with a long spear, or pike, a shield and heavy armor.

The remaining class or classes (rorarii) were lightly armed with the javelin (verutum). They were no doubt used for skirmishing, to  disrupt the enemy ranks before the main battle.

The officers as well as the cavalry were either not in the six classes or were of the first class. The question remains open. If the nobility were above the six, they were drawn from the senatorial rank or rank of equestrians (equites), also known as knights.

Reforms of Camillus
All in all the Roman army consisted of 18 centuries of equites, 82 centuries of the first class (of which 2 centuries were engineers), 20 centuries each of the second, third and fourth classes and 32 centuries of the fifth class (of which 2 centuries were trumpeters).

Even these measures were inadequate to the challenges Rome was to face. They went to war with the Hernici, Volsci and Latini (Italics), undertook the reduction of Etruria and endured an invasion of Gauls under Brennus. Into the gap stepped one of the great generals Rome seemed able to produce at critical moments: Marcus Furius Camillus. He held various offices, such as interrex and dictator, but was never king himself.

In the early fourth century BC, Rome suffered its greatest humiliation when Po valley Celts under Brennus sacked Rome itself. The Romans wanted to abandon the city and resettle at Veii (an Etruscan city), but Camillus prevented it. If Rome was to re-establish her authority over central Italy and be prepared to meet any similar disasters in future, some reorganization was needed. These changes were traditionally believed to have been the work of Camillus, but according to another theory, they were introduced gradually during the second half of the fourth century BC.

Italy was not governed by city states like Greece, where armies met on large plains, deemed suitable by both sides, to reach a decision. Far more it was a collection of hill tribes using the difficult terrain to their advantage. Something altogether more flexible was needed to combat such foes than the unwieldy, slow-moving phalanx.

The legio, or "levy", was introduced at this time, with a structure of manipuli ("handsful"). The infantry adopted a looser fighting formation distinct from the earlier tightly packed hoplite shield wall, and soldiers began to carry javelins. In this formation, the Romans became more like their Gallic adversaries than Greek hoplites.

Conscription

When it was time to draft additional soldiers into the military, they would look to their citizens for assistance in the defense of Rome. In the writings of Polybius it was in the natural order of a Roman citizen to fight in the military. However, the military was divided by class and wealth. The poorer citizens made up most of the light infantry (velites) of the legion. The higher class equites were drafted into the cavalry because they could afford a horse.

Organization

The Roman army was divided into 30 legions. Each legion was made up of about 4000 to 5000 legionaries. Each legion was made up of 10 cohorts, each cohort consisting of 480 legionaries. A cohort was made up of six groups (centuries) of 80 men. Each century was led by a centurion and was further divided into eight groups called contubernia.

While in this stretch the centurion, was stead to lead 100 legionaries. Centurions have been thought to lead from the writings of Polybius the centuries, and have been keen in the Roman military stance of tactics, leadership and knowledge of their troops. The centurion was a key part of the Roman military because he provided leadership to the troops that were divided among cohorts and legions, however it gave them the morale for each to be a decisive point in their ranks because of the centurion.

Non-citizens could fight for Rome as well; however, they were paid less and were not given the best armor and weaponry. These soldiers were called auxiliaries.

Framework for combat

That there are multiple degrees of influence on this subject it is based on the individual soldier to the legion then also compared to the ways of combat being in melee or by ranged combat each being in a different respect.

For individual experience it is framed as for legionaries that you will be very aggressive and fight for a time of 15 to 20 minutes and trying to stay alive while doing this and going to rest and let the for the formations re-rank and let them rest; which is an achievement that is very worthy to fight hand to hand in combat with more than likely overwhelming odds and trying to stay alive while still fighting and keeping a line in the battlefield is quite a feat. However ranged combat would be common in the legion, however it isn't truly elaborated on.

See also
 Political history of the Roman military
 Military history of ancient Rome

References

 
Roman Kingdom